Michael Thomas Francis McGuire (3 May 1926 – 16 August 2018) was a British Labour Party politician.

McGuire was born in Carrowmore, County Mayo, Ireland in May 1926. He was a branch secretary of the National Union of Mineworkers. Upon being elected as Member of Parliament, represented Ince from 1964 to 1983, and Makerfield from 1983 until he was deselected by his constituency party in 1987, largely because of his failure to support the miners' strike of 1984 to 1985.

In 1954 he married Marie T. Murphy (died 1998), with whom he had three sons and two daughters. He died in Aintree University Hospital in August 2018 at the age of 92.

References

The Times Guide to the House of Commons, Times Newspapers Ltd, 1966 & 1983

1926 births
2018 deaths
British people of Irish descent
Labour Party (UK) MPs for English constituencies
National Union of Mineworkers-sponsored MPs
UK MPs 1964–1966
UK MPs 1966–1970
UK MPs 1970–1974
UK MPs 1974
UK MPs 1974–1979
UK MPs 1979–1983
UK MPs 1983–1987
Members of the Parliament of the United Kingdom for Makerfield
Politicians from County Mayo